Ellnor Judith Grassby, née Louez (born 14 January 1937), a former Australian politician, was a member of the multi-member single constituency unicameral Australian Capital Territory Legislative Assembly, representing the Labor Party between 1989 and 1995. Grassby served as Minister for Housing and Urban Services in the First Follett Ministry.

Biography
Prior to entering politics, Ellnor Grassby was employed in the accreditation of nurses, owned and managed hotels, and was a volunteer fundraiser and board member for a number of non-profit organisations.

Ellnor Grassby was elected to the inaugural ACT Legislative Assembly at the 1989 general election, and re-elected to the second Assembly at the 1992 general election. Grassby contested the multi-member electorate of Ginninderra at the 1995 general election, but was unsuccessful. She served as the Minister for Housing and Urban Services in the First Follett Ministry, during 1989; however was not appointed to subsequent Labor ministries.

During 2003–2005, Grassby served on the Chief Minister's Ministerial Advisory Council on Multicultural Affairs.

She was a board member of Naming Australia Incorporated, a community organisation comprising representatives from the Spanish community, the Embassy of Spain in Australia, the business community and the ACT government who organisated celebrations for the 400th anniversary, in 2006, of Spanish contribution to the history and naming of Australia.

Following the 2005 death of Al Grassby, media reports revealed that Ellnor Grassby was aware that her husband had lovers. However, she rejected allegations that the couple had separated thirty years earlier.

See also
 First Follett Ministry
 Al Grassby

References

Australian Labor Party members of the Australian Capital Territory Legislative Assembly
Members of the Australian Capital Territory Legislative Assembly
Spouses of Australian politicians
1937 births
Living people
Women members of the Australian Capital Territory Legislative Assembly